Shannon Brown (born November 29, 1985) is an American former professional basketball player. He attended Proviso East High School in Maywood, Illinois, was named Illinois Mr. Basketball in 2003, and played college basketball for Michigan State University. He was drafted by the Cleveland Cavaliers with the 25th overall pick in the 2006 NBA draft.

High school and college career
Brown attended Proviso East High School in Maywood, where his teammates included fellow 2006 draftee Dee Brown. In 2003, he was named Illinois Mr. Basketball and a McDonald's All-American.

Considered a five-star recruit by Rivals.com, Brown was listed as the No. 1 shooting guard and the No. 3 player in the nation in 2003.

Brown played college basketball for the Michigan State Spartans. He was second-team All-Big Ten as a junior and an All-Big Ten Defensive selection.

Professional career

Cleveland Cavaliers (2006–2008)

Brown was drafted in the first round with the 25th pick of the 2006 NBA draft by the Cleveland Cavaliers. Appearing in only 23 games (five starts) in his debut season, he showed promise, scoring in double figures twice (10 points vs. New York on November 29 and 14 vs. Toronto on 3/3), but was hampered by an injury to his shin.

Brown was assigned to the NBA Development League's Albuquerque Thunderbirds on March 2, 2007, but was recalled by the Cavaliers a day later. In his sole game as a Thunderbird, Brown scored 14 points with four rebounds and six assists. Brown returned to the NBA Development League, this time with the Rio Grande Valley Vipers, on January 11, 2008. In four games as a Viper, He averaged 23.5 points, including a 37-point performance against the Dakota Wizards on January 16. He was recalled by the Cavaliers on January 17.

Through 2007–08's All-Star break, Brown played in 15 games during the season (starting four games), averaging 7.0 points per game.

Chicago Bulls (2008)
On February 21, 2008, Brown was traded to the Chicago Bulls as part of a three-team deal between the Bulls, the Cavaliers, and the Sonics. The Sonics received Cavs forward Ira Newble, Cavs forward Donyell Marshall, and Bulls forward Adrian Griffin. The Cavs received Bulls center Ben Wallace, Bulls forward Joe Smith, the Bulls' 2009 second round pick (who turned out to be Danny Green), Sonics forward Wally Szczerbiak, and Sonics guard Delonte West. While the Bulls received Brown, Cavs forward Drew Gooden, Cavs guard Larry Hughes, and Cavs forward Cedric Simmons.

Charlotte Bobcats (2008–2009)
On August 6, 2008, Brown was signed to the Charlotte Bobcats to a one-year contract worth the minimum NBA salary of $800,000. He would average only 4.8 points in limited action with the Bobcats.

Los Angeles Lakers (2009–2011)
On February 7, 2009, Brown was traded, along with Adam Morrison, to the Los Angeles Lakers for Vladimir Radmanović.

Brown's playing time with the Lakers was initially limited. Towards the end of the season, Brown experienced an upswing of playtime. In the final five games of the season, Brown played for an average of 16.4 minutes. With those minutes, he averaged 7.2 points, 2.4 rebounds, and 1.6 assists.

Brown's increased playtime carried on to the playoffs. In the opening game in the first round match-up against the Jazz, Brown played 22 minutes. He had nine points, three assists, two rebounds and a steal. He finished the series averaging 17.4 minutes, 7.2 points, 1.2 rebounds, 1.8 assists, and one steal per game.

On July 6, 2009, Brown agreed to return to the Lakers for two years and $4.2 million.

It was announced on January 18, 2010, that he was selected to compete in the Sprite Slam Dunk Competition in Dallas at the 2010 All-Star weekend. On the same day, Brown led the Lakers with 22 points in their 98–92 win against the Orlando Magic. Brown participated in the dunk contest on February 13, 2010, but did not advance beyond the first round.

On February 16, 2010, in a game against the Golden State Warriors, Brown scored a then career-high 27 points and grabbed 10 rebounds for his first career double-double. He won his second championship at the end of the season.

On August 8, 2010, Brown signed a two-year deal with the Lakers worth $4.6 million. During that season, he averaged 8.7 points in 19 minutes per game. He scored a season-high 21 points in two separate games, against the Milwaukee Bucks (November 16) and the Chicago Bulls (November 23). During the postseason, Brown averaged seven points per game. In the Lakers' last two games against the Dallas Mavericks, Brown scored 10 and 15 points respectively before his team was swept by the eventual champion.

On June 30, 2011, Brown elected not to exercise his option to extend his contract with the Lakers for the 2011–12 season.

Phoenix Suns (2011–2013)
After the 2011 NBA lockout ended on December 8, 2011, the Phoenix Suns signed Brown to a one-year contract. On March 15, 2012, Brown led the Suns with 21 points in a tough 91–87 victory over the Los Angeles Clippers. On March 27, 2012, Brown scored a career-high 32 points, with five 3-pointers, in a loss to the San Antonio Spurs. On April 7, 2012, Brown scored 20 points in the third quarter against his former team, the Los Angeles Lakers. He led the team with 24 points in a blowout 125–105 victory. Two days later, Brown grabbed seven rebounds for the Suns (tied for the team game-high with Marcin Gortat) in a blowout 114–90 victory against the Minnesota Timberwolves.

On July 25, 2012, Brown agreed to re-sign with Phoenix on a two-year deal worth $7 million. On November 7, 2012, Brown hit six straight three-pointers in the fourth quarter to lead the team in points with 24 and help them win 117–110 against his former team, the Charlotte Bobcats. Two days later, he scored 12 of his 22 points in the fourth quarter of a 107–105 victory against another former team, the Cleveland Cavaliers. This was the first time he scored 20 or more points in consecutive games.

On October 25, 2013, Brown was traded, along with Marcin Gortat, Malcolm Lee, and Kendall Marshall, to the Washington Wizards in exchange for Emeka Okafor and a 2014 first-round draft pick. Brown, Lee, and Marshall were all waived by the Wizards three days later.

San Antonio Spurs (2014)
On February 1, 2014, Brown signed a 10-day contract with the San Antonio Spurs. On February 12, 2014, he signed a second 10-day contract with the Spurs. After Brown's second 10-day contract expired, the Spurs decided to part ways with him. The Spurs would eventually win the 2014 Finals the same season, their 5th title in franchise history.

New York Knicks (2014)
On February 27, 2014, Brown signed a 10-day contract with the New York Knicks. On March 10, 2014, he signed a second 10-day contract with the Knicks. On March 20, 2014, he signed with the Knicks for the rest of the season. On July 23, 2014, he was waived by the Knicks.

Miami Heat (2014)
On August 27, 2014, Brown signed with the Miami Heat. On November 24, 2014, he was waived by the Heat after appearing in five games.

Wisconsin Herd (2017–2018)
On October 30, 2016, Brown was selected by the Grand Rapids Drive in the second round of the 2016 NBA Development League Draft, but was waived by the Drive on November 10.

On November 16, 2017, Brown was added to the roster of the Milwaukee Bucks G-League affiliate, the Wisconsin Herd.

Delaware 87ers (2018)
On January 26, 2018, Brown was traded to the Delaware 87ers, making his debut that same day.

Career statistics

NBA

Regular season 

|-
| style="text-align:left;"| 
| style="text-align:left;"| Cleveland
| 23 || 5 || 8.8 || .378 || .280 || .714 || .9 || .4 || .3 || .1 || 3.2
|-
| style="text-align:left;"| 
| style="text-align:left;"| Cleveland
| 15 || 4 || 14.5 || .369 || .310 || .609 || 1.2 || 1.1 || .7 || .1 || 7.0
|-
| style="text-align:left;"| 
| style="text-align:left;"| Chicago
| 6 || 0 || 3.7 || .200 || .000 || .500 || .3 || .0 || .2 || .3 || 1.5
|-
| style="text-align:left;"| 
| style="text-align:left;"| Charlotte
| 30 || 0 || 11.4 || .455 || .286 || .800 || .8 || .9 || .6 || .2 || 4.8
|-
|  style="text-align:left; background:#afe6ba;"| †
| style="text-align:left;"| L.A. Lakers
| 18 || 0 || 7.6 || .524 || .667 || .889 || 1.1 || .6 || .2 || .1 || 3.2
|-
|  style="text-align:left; background:#afe6ba;"| †
| style="text-align:left;"| L.A. Lakers
| 82 || 7 || 20.7 || .427 || .328 || .818 || 2.2 || 1.3 || .7 || .4 || 8.1
|-
| style="text-align:left;"| 
| style="text-align:left;"| L.A. Lakers
| 82 || 0 || 19.1 || .425 || .349 || .911 || 1.9 || 1.2 || .8 || .2 || 8.7
|-
| style="text-align:left;"| 
| style="text-align:left;"| Phoenix
| 59 || 19 || 23.7 || .420 || .362 || .808 || 2.7 || 1.2 || .7 || .3 || 11.0
|-
| style="text-align:left;"| 
| style="text-align:left;"| Phoenix
| 59 || 22 || 23.8 || .420 || .277 || .784 || 2.5 || 1.8 || 1.0 || .3 || 10.5
|-
| style="text-align:left;"| 
| style="text-align:left;"| San Antonio
| 10 || 1 || 10.3 || .286 || .000 || .778 || 1.3 || .5 || .1 || .0 || 2.3
|-
| style="text-align:left;"| 
| style="text-align:left;"| New York
| 19 || 0 || 7.8 || .421 || .000 || .667 || .8 || .2 || .6 || .0 || 2.1
|-
| style="text-align:left;"| 
| style="text-align:left;"| Miami
| 5 || 2 || 17.8 || .368 || .429 || .667 || .2 || .6 || .8 || .0 || 4.0
|- class="sortbottom"
| style="text-align:center;" colspan="2"| Career 
| 408 || 60 || 18.0 || .420 || .332 || .807 || 1.9 || 1.1 || .7 || .2 || 7.6

Playoffs 

|-
| style="text-align:left;"| 2007
| style="text-align:left;"| Cleveland
| 1 || 0 || .0 || .000 || .000 || .000 || .0 || .0 || .0 || .0 || .0
|-
|  style="text-align:left; background:#afe6ba;"| 2009†
| style="text-align:left;"| L.A. Lakers
| 21 || 0 || 13.1 || .434 || .480 || .792 || 1.2 || .6 || .5 || .1 || 4.9
|-
|  style="text-align:left; background:#afe6ba;"| 2010†
| style="text-align:left;"| L.A. Lakers
| 23 || 0 || 14.1 || .393 || .281 || .714 || 1.3 || .9 || .4 || .3 || 4.9
|-
| style="text-align:left;"| 2011
| style="text-align:left;"| L.A. Lakers
| 10 || 0 || 16.6 || .459 || .280 || .643 || 1.9 || .7 || .6 || .2 || 7.2
|- class="sortbottom"
| style="text-align:center;" colspan="2"| Career 
| 55 || 0 || 13.9 || .422 || .341 || .727 || 1.3 || .7 || .5 || .2 || 5.2

College

|-
| style="text-align:left;"| 2003–04
| style="text-align:left;"| Michigan State
| 30 || 24 || 22.9 || .451 || .341 || .807 || 2.5 || 1.3 || 1.1 || .0 || 7.9
|-
| style="text-align:left;"| 2004–05
| style="text-align:left;"| Michigan State
| 33 || 31 || 25.1 || .447 || .330 || .848 || 3.2 || 1.7 || 1.2 || .2 || 10.9
|-
| style="text-align:left;"| 2005–06
| style="text-align:left;"| Michigan State
| 34 || 34 || 35.2 || .467 || .390 || .830 || 4.4 || 2.7 || 1.5 || .1 || 17.2
|- class="sortbottom"
| style="text-align:center;" colspan="2" |Total
| 97 || 89 || 28.0 || .457 || .364 || .831 || 3.4 || 1.9 || 1.3 || .1 || 12.2

Music video and film appearances
He appeared in music videos to Toni Braxton's "Yesterday", Monica's "Love All Over Me", and Nelly's "Just a Dream".

Brown appears as himself in the 2012 film Think Like a Man. Brown also appears in the 2015 film Trainwreck as a member of the Knicks.

Personal life
Brown has a son, Shannon Christopher Brown, and a daughter, Laiyah Shannon Brown, from his marriage to Monica.

In 2010, Brown began a relationship with R&B singer Monica. The pair met in June of that  year when Brown was consulted to star as her love interest in the music video for the single "Love All Over Me". In October 2010, Monica confirmed her engagement to Brown via Twitter, posting a photo of her rose-cut diamond ring. On November 22, 2010, Monica and Brown were married in a secret ceremony at their Los Angeles home. The marriage, however, did not become a matter of public record until January 21, 2011, when Brown told the Hip-Hop Non-Stop TV-Show. The couple had a second wedding ceremony for family and friends in July 2011.

On March 27, 2019, it was reported Monica was divorcing Brown. As of October 2019, their divorce was finalized.

On October 7, 2021, Brown was indicted for insurance fraud in the Southern District of New York for allegedly defrauding the NBA's health and welfare benefit plan.

His brother Sterling Brown is an NBA G League player playing for the Raptors 905.

References

External links

Michigan State bio

1985 births
Living people
African-American basketball players
American men's basketball players
Basketball players from Illinois
Big3 players
Charlotte Bobcats players
Chicago Bulls players
Cleveland Cavaliers draft picks
Cleveland Cavaliers players
Delaware 87ers players
Iowa Energy players
Los Angeles Lakers players
McDonald's High School All-Americans
Miami Heat players
Michigan State Spartans men's basketball players
New York Knicks players
Parade High School All-Americans (boys' basketball)
Phoenix Suns players
Point guards
Rio Grande Valley Vipers players
San Antonio Spurs players
Shooting guards
Sportspeople from Maywood, Illinois
Wisconsin Herd players
21st-century African-American sportspeople
20th-century African-American people
American men's 3x3 basketball players